Joseph Cobham Noyes (September 22, 1798 – July 28, 1868) was a United States representative from Maine.

Life
Noyes was born in Portland, Massachusetts (now in Maine) on September 22, 1798. He attended the common schools and moved to Eastport, in 1819. There he was a ship chandler and shipper of merchandise.

A member of the State house of representatives in 1833, Noyes was elected as a Whig to the Twenty-fifth Congress (March 4, 1837 – March 3, 1839). He was an unsuccessful candidate for re-election in 1838 to the Twenty-sixth Congress.

Collector of customs for the district of Passamaquoddy, Maine, 1841–1843, Noyes back moved to Portland and engaged in the flour and commission business. He was treasurer of the Portland Co. (locomotive works) in 1859; and one of the founders of the Portland Savings Bank in 1852, serving as treasurer from 1859 until his death in Portland, Cumberland County, Maine, July 28, 1868. He was interred in Evergreen Cemetery.

References

1798 births
1868 deaths
Politicians from Portland, Maine
People from Eastport, Maine
Businesspeople from Maine
Whig Party members of the United States House of Representatives from Maine
19th-century American politicians
19th-century American businesspeople